1993 JEF United Ichihara season

Review and events

League results summary

League results by round

Competitions

Domestic results

J.League

Suntory series

NICOS series

Emperor's Cup

J.League Cup

Player statistics

 † player(s) joined the team after the opening of this season.

Transfers

In:

Out:

Transfers during the season

In
Frank Ordenewitz (Otze) (from 1. FC Köln on July)

Out

Notes

References

Other pages
 J. League official site
 JEF United Ichihara Chiba official web site

JEF United Ichihara
JEF United Chiba seasons